Okçu is a village in Bor district of Niğde Province, Turkey. At  it is situated in the southern slopes of Melendiz Mountain. The population of Okçu was 194 as of 2011.

References 

Villages in Bor District, Niğde